Cyril J. O'Regan (born 1952) is an Irish Catholic intellectual and the Catherine F. Huisking Professor of Theology at the University of Notre Dame. O'Regan studied at University College Dublin gaining a BA and MA. He studied at Yale University earning an MA, MLitt and PhD.

He specialises in systematic theology and historical theology, with a specific interest in continental philosophy, religious literature, mystical theology and post-modern thought. He is best known for his multi-volume gnosticism series. This series began with Gnostic Return in Modernity and continued in Gnostic Apocalypse: Jacob Boehme's Haunted Narrative. Discussing a project attempted in the nineteenth century by a leader of the Tübingen school of theology, Ferdinand Christian Baur, O'Regan attempts to identify a gnostic structure or "grammar" that can be traced through sources and authors as diverse as Valentinianism and William Blake. By identifying this grammar, he hoped to find a way to distinguish works of gnosticism from other types with superficial resemblances, such as writings in Neoplatonism. As a Christian theologian, he also hopes to equip theologians to avoid gnosticism, which he sees as an alternative contrary to genuine Christian faith yet, by its nature, one that is present in every era. This project is in some ways similar to that of Eric Voegelin, who in his Science, Politics and Gnosticism (1968) attempted to identify some core features of gnosticism that he viewed as dangerous, though the two thinkers disagree about how to define gnosticism and why it should be rejected.

Upon the completion of the von Balthasar series with the second Anatomy of Misremembering volume, O'Regan will focus his attention on two further volumes in his gnosticism series. The next volume, the third in the series, will focus on German Idealism (chiefly, G. W. F. Hegel, F. W. J. Schelling, and Johann Gottlieb Fichte), with a later, fourth volume covering German and English Romanticism (chiefly, William Blake, Johann Christian Friedrich Hölderlin and Georg Philipp Friedrich Freiherr von Hardenberg (Novalis). In advocating for new ways of recognizing gnosticism, O'Regan draws on categories such as metalepsis that he developed in his earlier work, The Heterodox Hegel. O'Regan has also written widely in monographs and reviews on the concept of the apocalyptic.

O'Regan strives at "showing how Boehme's discourse is Valentinian" and "Philadelphian Society and William Law in England, Pietism in Germany, Louis Claude de St. Martin in France, and Swedenborg in Sweden, and the theosophy societies of the twentieth century" had "repeat Boehme's discourse in a very determinate way"

O'Regan states that "The redemptive activity of Christ in Luther obviously presupposes a fallen humanity, which in turn points back to creatureliness and createdness."

O'Regan in Gnostic Apocalypse asserts his "conversation with not only with David Walsh and the Voegelin school of interpretation, but also with the radically different kind of genealogy of Michel Foucault".

O'Regan countered the Gnostic response to the problem of evil in  Gnostic Apocalypse: Jacob Boehme's Haunted Narrative.
O'Regan remarks, 

He has discussed Slavoj Zizek

References

Bibliography 
 O'Regan, Cyril, 1994, The Heterodox Hegel. Albany: State University of New York (SUNY) Press.
 O'Regan, Cyril, 2001, Gnostic Return in Modernity. Albany: SUNY Press.
 O'Regan, Cyril, 2002, Gnostic Apocalypse: Jacob Boehme's Haunted Narrative. Albany: SUNY Press.
 O'Regan, Cyril, 2004, "Countermimesis and Simone Weil's Christian Platonism." In E. Jane Doering and Eric O. Springsted, eds., The Christian Platonism of Simone Weil. Notre Dame: University of Notre Dame Press, 181–208.
 O'Regan, Cyril, 2009, Theology and the Spaces of Apocalyptic. Milwaukee: Marquette University Press.
 O'Regan, Cyril, 2013, Foreword in Sarah Morice-Brubaker, The Place of the Spirit: Toward a Trinitarian Theology of Location. Eugene: Pickwick, ix–xiii.
 O'Regan, Cyril, 2014, The Anatomy of Misremembering: Von Balthasar’s Response to Philosophical Modernity, Volume 1: Hegel. Chestnut Ridge:  Crossroad Publishing.
 O'Regan, Cyril, forthcoming, The Anatomy of Misremembering: Von Balthasar's Response to Philosophical Modernity, Volume 2: Heidegger. Chestnut Ridge: Crossroad Publishing.

20th-century Irish Roman Catholic theologians
University of Notre Dame faculty
Living people
Irish emigrants to the United States
1952 births
Alumni of University College Dublin
Yale University alumni
21st-century Irish Roman Catholic theologians
Christian anti-Gnosticism
Christian continental philosophers and theologians
Systematic theologians
Hegel scholars
Historians of Gnosticism